Chataparru is a village in Eluru mandal of Eluru district, Andhra Pradesh, India. Veteran Telugu film producer Vijaya Bapineedu and Telugu film actor Murali Mohan were born in this village. Government of Andhra Pradesh selected this village as Smart Village.

Demographics
According to Indian census, 2001, the demographic details of this village is as follows:
 Total Population      : 7273 in 1,764 Households.
 Male Population       : 3608 and Female Population: 3665
 Children Under 6-years: 772 (Boys - 379 and Girls - 393)
 Total Literates       : 5389

Transport
Chataparru is well connected to Eluru by road. APS RTC operates bus services from Eluru and Bhimavaram to this region. Chataparru has its own railway station connecting major cities.

References

External links

Villages in Eluru district